The Horn Mountains,  el. , is a small mountain range northwest of Henry's Lake, Idaho in Madison County, Montana.

See also
 List of mountain ranges in Montana

Notes

Mountain ranges of Montana
Landforms of Madison County, Montana